
1930s – 1940s – 1950s – 1960s – 1970s – 1980s – 1990s – 2000s

1930s
1930 – 1931 – 1932 – 1933 – 1934 – 1935 – 1936 – 1937 – 1938 – 1939

1933
ASC Diaraf (then as Foyer France Sénégal) football club founded in the city of Dakar
US Gorée football club founded in Dakar

1940s
1940 – 1941 – 1942 – 1943 – 1944 – 1945 – 1946 – 1947 – 1948 – 1949

1947
US Gorée won the first French West African Cup

1948
Foyer France of Senegal (now ASC Diaraf) won their only French West African Cup title

1949
Racing Dakar (now probably AS Douanes won their only French West African Cup title

1950s
1950 – 1951 – 1952 – 1953 – 1954 – 1955 – 1956 – 1957

1950
Espoir Saint-Louis (now part of ASC Linguère participated in the French West African Cup, they failed to win after losing to Racing Conakry (now probably AS Kaloum Star) in the finals
Djourbel football club founded, it is now known as ASC SUNEOR Djourbel

1951
ASC Jeanne d'Arc won their first French West African Cup title

1952
ASC Jeanne d'Arc won their second consecutive and their final French West African Cup title

1953
US Gorée lost to Jeanne d'Arc of Bamako (now Stade Malien) in the semis

1954
US Gorée won their second French West African Cup title

1955
US Gorée won their second consecutive and their final French West African Cup title

1956
Foyer France Sénégal lost to Jeanne d'Arc of Bamako (now Stade Malien)

1957
Réveil de Saint-Louis (now part of ASC Linguère) won their only French West African Cup title

1958
Foyer France Sénégal lost to Africa Sports of Abidjan, Ivory Coast in the semis

1959
Saint-Louisienne (now part of ASC Linguère) won their only French West African Cup title

1960s
1960 – 1961 – 1962 – 1963 – 1964 – 1965 – 1966 – 1967 – 1968 – 1969

1960
Saint-Louisienne (now part of ASC Linguère) lost to Jeanne d'Arc of Bamako (now Stade Malien) in the semis.  It was the last Senegalese appearance in French West African Cup and also the last French West African Cup.
ASC Jeanne d'Arc of Dakar became the first champion of an independent Senegal
Casa Sports of Ziguinchor founded

1961
Espoir de Saint-Louis became the first Senegalese cup winner

1962
ASC Jeanne d'Arc won their first Senegalese Cup title

1963
US Rail of Thiès won their only Senegalese Cup title

1964
Olympique Thiès won their first championship title
US Ouakam won their first Senegalese Cup title

1965
US Gorée won their first Senegalese Cup title

1966
Olympique Thiès won their second and last championship title for the club
AS Saint-Louisienne (now part of ASC Linguère) won their only Senegalese Cup title

1967
Espoir de Saint-Louis (now ASC Linguère) won their only championship title
Foyer France Sénégal (now ASC Diaraf) won their first Senegalese Cup title

1968
Foyer France Sénégal (now ASC Diaraf) won their second championship and cup titles and the last under that name

1969
ASEC Ndiambour football club founded in Louga
ASC Linguère founded after the merger of its clubs in the area
Foyer France Sénégal became the first club to compete at the continental championships then known as the African Cup of Champions Clubs
ASC Jeanne d'Arc won their second championship and their second cup title
Foyer France Sénégal changed its name to ASC Diaraf

1970s
1970 – 1971 – 1972 – 1973 – 1974 – 1975 – 1976 – 1977 – 1978 – 1979

1970
ASC Niayés-Pikine (now known as AS Pikine) founded in Pikine in suburban Dakar
ASC Diaraf won their third championship title and the first under the new name along with their third cup title

1971
ASFA Dakar won their first championship title
ASC Linguère won their first cup title

1972
ASFA Dakar won their second championship title
US Gorée won their second cup title

1973
ASC Jeanne d'Arc won their third championship title
ASC Diaraf won their fourth cup title

1974
ASFA Dakar won their third and last championship title for the club
ASC Jeanne d'Arc won their third cup title

1975
ASC Diaraf won their fifth cup title
ASC Diaraf won their fourth championship title

1976
AS Police won their first cup title
ASC Diaraf won their fifth championship title and their second consecutive

1977
Saltigues Rufisque won their only cup title
ASC Diaraf won their sixth championship title and their third consecutive

1978
AS Police won their second cup title
US Gorée won their first championship title

1979
Casa Sport won their first cup title
AS Police won their first championship title
AS Police won their first National Assembly (super cup) title

1980s
1980 – 1981 – 1982 – 1983 – 1984 – 1985 – 1986 – 1987 – 1988 – 1989

1980
AS Douanes football club based in Dakar founded
SEIB Diourbel (now ASC SUNEOR) won their first championship title
ASC Jeanne d'Arc won their fourth cup title

1981
US Gorée won their second championship title
AS Police won their third and last cup title for the club
AS Police won their second and last National Assembly (super cup) title

1982
ASC Diaraf won their seventh championship title
ASC Diaraf won their  seventh cup title

1983
SEIB Diourbel (now ASC SUNEOR) won their second championship title
ASC Diaraf won their eighth cup title

1984
US Gorée won their third championship title
ASC Jeanne d'Arc won their fifth cup title

1985
ASC Jeanne d'Arc won their fourth championship title
ASC Diaraf won their eighth cup title

1986
AS Douanes won their first cup title
ASC Jeanne d'Arc won their fifth championship title
ASC Jeanne d'Arc won their first National Assembly (super cup) title

1987
ASC Jeanne d'Arc won their sixth cup title
SEIB Diourbel (now ASC SUNEOR) won their third championship title and last under the name
ASC Diaraf won their first National Assembly (super cup) title

1988
ASC Jeanne d'Arc won their eighth cup title
ASC Jeanne d'Arc won their sixth championship title

1989
US Ouakam won their second and last cup title for the club
ASC Diaraf won their eighth championship title
ASC Jeanne d'Arc won their second National Assembly (super cup) title

1990s
1990 – 1991 – 1992 – 1993 – 1994 – 1995 – 1996 – 1997 – 1998 – 1999

1990
ASC Linguère won their third cup title
UCST Port Autonome won their first championship title

1991
ASC Diaraf won their ninth cup title
ASC Port Autonome won their second championship title
ASC Diaraf won their second National Assembly (super cup) title

1992
ASC Jeanne d'Arc participated in the 1992 WAFU Club Championship
US Gorée won their third cup title
ASEC Ndiambour won their first championship title

1993
ASC Diaraf won their tenth cup title
AS Douanes won their first championship title
Dial Diop disqualified as they forfeited two matches, all matches that Dial Diop took part were annulled

1994
ASC Diaraf won their eleventh cup title
ASEC Ndiamnbour won their second championship title

1995
ASC Diaraf won their twelfth cup title
ASC Diaraf won their ninth championship title

1996
ASEC Ndiambour took part in the 1996 WAFU Club Championship
US Gorée won their fourth and last cup title
Diourbel as SONACOS (now ASC SUNEOR) won their fourth championship title and the only under the name

1997
ASC Saloum football club founded after the merger of AS Kaolack and Mbossé-Kaolack
AS Douanes won their second cup title
AS Douanes won their second championship title

1998
ASC Jeanne d'Arc won their and last ninth cup title
ASEC Ndiambour won their third and last championship title
ASEC Ndiambour won their first National Assembly (super cup) title

1999
ASC Yeggo won their only cup title
ASC Jeanne d'Arc won their seventh championship title
The 1999 National Assembly edition was cancelled

2000s
2000 – 2001 – 2002 – 2003 – 2004 – 2005 – 2006 – 2007 – 2008 – 2009

2000
ASC Port Autonome won their only cup title
ASC Diaraf won their tenth championship title
ASC Port Autonome won their only National Assembly (super cup) title
Diambars FC of Saly founded

2001
ASC Jeanne d'Arc won their tenth cup title
ASC Jeanne d'Arc won their eighth championship title
ASC Jeanne d'Arc won their third and last National Assembly (super cup) title

2002
AS Douanes won their third cup title
ASC Jeanne d'Arc won their ninth championship title and their second consecutive
ASEC Ndiambour won their second National Assembly (super cup) title

2003
AS Douanes won their fourth cup title and their second consecutive
ASC Jeanne d'Arc won their tenth championship title and their third consecutive
ASC Diaraf won their third National Assembly (super cup) title

2004
ASC Diaraf won their eleventh championship title
AS Douanes won their fifth cup title and their third consecutive
ASEC Ndiambour won their fourth and last National Assembly (super cup) title

2005
AS Douanes won their sixth and last cup title and their fourth consecutive
ASC Port Autonome won their third and last championship title.
SONACOS (now ASC SUNEOR) Djourbel won their only National Assembly (super cup) title

2006
AS Douanes won their third championship title
US Ouakam won their third and last cup title
ASC Diaraf won their fourth and last National Assembly (super cup) title

2007
ASC Linguère won their fourth and final cup title
AS Douanes won their fourth consecutive championship title and their second consecutive

2008
ASC Diaraf won their thirteenth cup title
AS Douanes won their fifth championship title and their third consecutive
ASC Yakaar won their only National Assembly (super cup) title
Division 1 becomes a professional competition

2009
ASC Diaraf won their fourteenth cup title and their second consecutive
AS Douanes won their first Senegalese League Cup
ASC Linguère won their first and only championship title after the merger
Division 1 and 2 became Ligue 1 and 2, the lower three became Nationale 1 and 2

2010s
2010 – 2011 – 2012 – 2013 – 2014 – 2015 – 2016 – 2017

2010
ASC Diaraf won their twelfth and last championship title
Casa Sport won their first league cup
Toure Kunda Footpro (now Mbour Petite-Côté) won their only cup title
Stade de Mbour won their only National Assembly (super cup) title

2011
AS Pikine won their only league cup title
US Ouakam won their only championship title
Casa Sport won their second and last cup title
Diambars FC won their first consecutive National Assembly (super cup) title

2012
ASC HLM won their only cup title
ASC Niarry-Tally won their only league cup title
Casa Sports won their only championship title
Diambars FC won their second consecutive National Assembly (super cup) title

2013
ASC Diaraf won their fifteenth and last cup title
Casa Sport won their second and last league cup title
Diambars FC of Saly won their only championship title
Diambars FC won their third consecutive and last National Assembly (super cup) title

2014
AS Pikine from suburban Dakar won their only cup title
AS Pikine from suburban Dakar won their only championship title
Olympique de Ngor won their only National Assembly (super cup) title
Guédiawaye FC won their only league cup title

2015
AS Douanes won their second and last league cup title
Génération Foot won their only cup title
AS Douanes won their sixth and last championship title
As a second placed cup winner, Olympique de Ngor competed in the 2015 CAF Confederation Cup
The National Assembly Cup becomes the Super Cup
AS Douanes won their only super cup title

2016
Diambars FC won their only league cup title
ASC Niarry-Tally won their only cup title
US Gorée won their fourth and last championship title
US Gorée won their only super cup title
US Gorée won their only Champion's Trophy

2017
Génération Foot won their only championship title, Ligue 1
Mbour Petite-Côte won their only national cup title
Stade de Mbour won their League Cup title
US Ouakam demoted, the club was out of competition as the team took the case to the international football court in Geneva, Switzerland where they won their right to remain in Ligue 1

See also
Timeline of association football

References

Football in Senegal
Senegalese Football